SS Shieldhall is a preserved steamship that operates from Southampton. She is one of the last reciprocating steam engined ships built, using technology that dated back to the last quarter of the 19th century and which was obsolete at the time of her construction. She spent her working life as one of the "Clyde sludge boats", making regular trips from Shieldhall in Glasgow, Scotland, down the River Clyde and Firth of Clyde past the Isle of Arran, to dump treated sewage sludge at sea. These steamships had a tradition, dating back to the First World War, of taking organised parties of passengers on their trips during the summer. SS Shieldhall has been preserved and the accommodation is again being put to good use for cruises.

History
The 1,972-ton Shieldhall was laid down in October 1954, built by Lobnitz & Co. of Renfrew who also constructed the two triple expansion steam engines which are set vertically in a similar way to the much larger engines on the RMS Titanic. By the 1950s Lobnitz usually built its engines with enclosed crankcases but the Shieldhall was deliberately fitted with traditional open-crank engines. Glasgow Corporation had long allowed day-trippers access to the engine room of its ships while at sea and the older-style engines allowed passengers to see the workings of the engines in operation.

She was built on the classic lines of a 1920s steam tanker with a traditional wheelhouse of riveted and welded construction, a slightly raked stem and a cruiser stern. Accommodation was provided for 80 passengers. She entered service in October 1955 and was operated by Glasgow Corporation to transport treated sewage sludge down the Clyde to be dumped at sea. She and her sister ships were jocularly known as Clyde banana boats as the livery resembled that of a well known banana shipping company.

In 1976 after 21 years of service on the Clyde, Shieldhall was laid up, and in the following year was bought by the Southern Water Authority to carry sludge from Southampton, England, to an area south of the Isle of Wight.

Preservation

Due to rising fuel prices she was withdrawn from service in 1985, then was taken over by a preservation society, The Solent Steam Packet Limited, which operates as a charity. All work associated with the Society and Shieldhall is carried out by unpaid volunteers. The remaining Glasgow sludge boats kept going into the 1990s, when changing environmental standards led to new ways of treating the sludge.

She has been restored to sea-going condition, and is listed as part of the National Historic Fleet. Shieldhall is now a frequent sight around the Solent running excursions, crewed by volunteers. She has been to the Netherlands for the Dordrecht Steam Festival and has been at International Festivals of the Sea at Bristol and Portsmouth. Passengers are encouraged to visit the bridge and see the engine room, getting an understanding of the days of steam.

In 1999, the ship was used in Rede Globo's Brazilian telenovela "Terra Nostra", playing a fictional Italian ship Andrea I.

In July 2005, Shieldhall made a return visit to the Clyde, taking part in the River Festival in Glasgow, and berthing at Custom House Quay, Greenock. She made a number of excursions, taking passengers on cruises from Greenock on her old route down the Clyde to Arran.

A £1.4 million grant from the Heritage Lottery Fund (HLF) was announced, in April 2013, for essential hull works to meet modern regulations, improved passenger facilities and interpretation. Further grants were made in 2019 and 2020.

References

External links

SS Shieldhall official website
SS Shieldhall - Marine Traffic A.I.S.
Podcast on Shieldhall by the Society for Nautical Research, interviewing the ship's chief engineer
Animation of the triple expansion engines prepared by the Society for Nautical Research

1955 ships
Steamships
Cargo ships of the United Kingdom
Ships of Scotland
Museum ships in the United Kingdom
Ships and vessels of the National Historic Fleet